The 2014–15 Russian Cup, known as the 2014–15 Pirelli–Russian Football Cup for sponsorship reasons, was the 23rd season of the Russian football knockout tournament since the dissolution of Soviet Union.

The competition started on 8 July 2014. The cup champion won a spot in the 2015–16 UEFA Europa League group stage.

The final match was played on 21 May 2015 at the Central Stadium in Astrakhan.

First round 
The games were played on 8, 14 July, 1 and 12 August 2014.

Second round 
The games were played on 15, 26, 28, 29 July, 1, 8 and 16 August 2014.

Third round
The games were played on 6, 11, 12, 16, 19 and 23 August 2014.

Fourth round
The games were played on 30 and 31 August 2014.

Round of 32
Clubs from Russian Football Premier League enter the competition at this round.

Round of 16

Quarter-finals

Semi-finals

Final

References

External links 
 Official page 

Russian Cup seasons
Cup
Russian Cup